Bailu is a town under the administration of Wuxi County, Chongqing, China. , it has 2 residential communities and 10 villages under its administration.

References 

Towns in Chongqing
Wuxi County